The steamboat Dart operated in the early 1900s as part of the Puget Sound Mosquito Fleet.

Career
Dart was built in 1911 by Matthew McDowell at Tacoma for his steamboat line's Seattle-Tacoma-East Pass run.  Dart a small vessel even by Mosquito Fleet standards.

Dart ran on the Seattle-Tacoma-East Pass route until about 1918, when Captain McDowell sold her to the Wrangell concern of W.T. Hale and P.C. McCormick, who converted Dart to a motor vessel to run mail between Wrangell and Prince of Wales Island.  Later, he sold Dart to Paul S. Charles of Ketchikan interests.

In 1925 the Anderson Tug Company purchased Dart and returned her to Puget Sound to operate as a tug.  In 1928 Dart burned on the Sound while awaiting scrapping. Her engines were salvaged and placed in the ferry City of Mukilteo. Her hull, still good apparently, was rebuilt as a diesel freighter and sent to work routes out of Juneau.

See also
 Matthew McDowell
 Puget Sound Mosquito Fleet

Notes

References
 Faber, Jim, Steamer's Wake, Enetai Press, Seattle, WA 1985 .
 Newell, Gordon R., and Williamson, Joe, Pacific Steamboats, Superior Publishing, Seattle, WA 1958.
 Newell, Gordon R., ed., H.W. McCurdy Marine History of the Pacific Northwest, Superior Publishing, Seattle, WA 1966

External links
University of Washington digital library image showing Dart approaching a landing on Puget Sound, circa 1915, a good view of this very small steamer

Steamboats of Washington (state)
History of Washington (state)
Propeller-driven steamboats of Washington (state)